Per Egil Ahlsen (born 4 March 1958) is a Norwegian former footballer. Ahlsen started as a midfielder, but was later re-educated as a forward defender. He was known for his long-shots.

Club career
Ahlsen started his career at the senior level with Fredrikstad FK in the middle of the 1970s. He won the cup trophy with Fredrikstad in 1984, thanks to his fantastic free kick goal from 35 meters – a goal that is often considered the most beautiful goal in Norwegian football. In 1987, he transferred to S.K. Brann where he played for six seasons, a part from a short loan period to German Fortuna Düsseldorf. 
Ahlsen became an iconic figure in S.K. Brann. He was looked upon as a saviour because he put a stop to the "elevator era" in S.K. Brann. He finished his career back in Fredrikstad, where he is now the assistant coach.

International career
He made his debut for the Norwegian national team in 1983 and earned 54 caps, scoring three goals.

Ahlsen was also a member of the Norwegian team competing at the 1984 Summer Olympics in Los Angeles, California.

References

External links
 

1958 births
Living people
Sportspeople from Fredrikstad
Norwegian footballers
Norway international footballers
Association football midfielders
Footballers at the 1984 Summer Olympics
Olympic footballers of Norway
Fredrikstad FK players
SK Brann players
Fortuna Düsseldorf players
Bundesliga players
Kniksen Award winners
Expatriate footballers in Germany